Misery Loves Company may refer to:

 Misery Loves Co., a Swedish industrial metal duo
 Misery Loves Company (album), a 2000 album by Rosemary's Sons
 "Misery Loves Company" (Porter Wagoner song), 1962
 Misery Loves Company (TV series), an American sitcom
 Misery Loves Kompany, a 2007 album by Tech N9ne
 "Misery Loves Company", a song by Anthrax from State of Euphoria
 "Misery Loves Company", a song by Emilie Autumn from Opheliac
 "Misery Loves Company", a song by Jackyl from Cut The Crap
 "Misery Loves Company", a song by Rebecca Black from Let Her Burn
 "Misery Loves Company", an episode of the series Ruby Gloom
 Misery Loves Company, a podcast hosted by stand-up comedian Kevin Brennan

See also
 Emotional contagion
 Misery Loves Cabernet, 2009 chick lit novel by Kim Gruenenfelder
 Misery Loves Comedy, 2006 album by Louis Logic and J.J. Brown